Eupithecia inconspicuata is a moth in the family Geometridae. It is found in Turkey.

References

Moths described in 1893
inconspicuata
Moths of Asia